Titan, in comic books,  can refer to:

DC Comics
 Titan, the moon of Saturn in DC Comics inhabited by telepaths in the 30th century of the Legion of Super-Heroes
 Titan (New Gods), a New Gods giant from Darkseid's Elite
 "Titan" or "Teen Titan", a member of the DC Comics superhero team Teen Titans

Marvel Comics
 Titan (Marvel Comics location), the moon of Saturn in Marvel Comics and home to the Titanian Eternals
 Titan (Imperial Guard), a member of the Shi'ar Imperial Guard

Other uses
 Titan (Dark Horse Comics), a Dark Horse Comics character
 Titan (Image Comics), an Image Comics character
 Titan Books, a publisher of comic reprints

See also
 Teen Titans (disambiguation)
 Titan (disambiguation)